The Eggstock (2,455 m) is a mountain of the Schwyzer Alps, located on the border between the Swiss canton of Schwyz and canton of Glarus, north of Braunwald. It lies on the range east of the Bös Fulen, between the valley of Bösbächi and the cirque of Braunwald and is composed of three summits: the Hinterer Eggstock (2,455 m), the Mittlerer Eggstock (2,436 m) and the Vorderer Eggstock (2,449 m).

References

External links

Hinterer Eggstock on Hikr

Mountains of the Alps
Mountains of Switzerland
Mountains of the canton of Schwyz
Mountains of the canton of Glarus
Two-thousanders of Switzerland